Hendrikus Jacobus Maria "Harry" van Raaij (29 August 1936 – 16 November 2020) was a Dutch functionary, who served as the chairman of PSV Eindhoven, a Dutch sports club, between 1996 and 2004.

Biography
Van Raaij was born in Haps on 29 August 1936. He was a proponent of the Atlantic League, which would have been a competition for larger clubs in smaller European countries. Professionally, he was a manager at Philips.

Van Raaij died on 16 November 2020 at the age of 84.

References

1936 births
2020 deaths
Dutch football chairmen and investors
People from Cuijk
PSV Eindhoven non-playing staff
Philips employees